Iswaeon is a genus of small minnow mayflies in the family Baetidae. There are at least three described species in Iswaeon.

Species
These three species belong to the genus Iswaeon:
 Iswaeon anoka (Daggy, 1945)
 Iswaeon davidi (Waltz & McCafferty, 2005)
 Iswaeon rubrolaterale (McDunnough, 1931)

References

Further reading

 
 
 
 

Mayflies
Articles created by Qbugbot